The 2017–18 Northern Illinois Huskies men's basketball team represented Northern Illinois University during the 2017–18 NCAA Division I men's basketball season. The Huskies, led by seventh-year head coach Mark Montgomery, played their home games at the Convocation Center in DeKalb, Illinois as members of the West Division of the Mid-American Conference. They finished the season 13–19, 6–12 in MAC play to finish in last place in the West Division. They lost in the first round of the MAC tournament to Kent State.

Previous season
The Huskies finished the 2016–17 season 15–17, 7–11 in MAC play to finish in a tie for fourth place in the West Division. As the No. 9 seed in the MAC tournament, they lost in the first round to Eastern Michigan.

Offseason

Coaching changes 
Following the season, assistant coach Lou Dawkins left the school to take an assistant coach position at Cleveland State. Assistant coach Jason Larson was not retained by the school following the season.

On April 28, 2017, the school hired Lamar Chapman as an assistant coach. On October 12, Brandon Watkins was hired as an assistant to round out the coaching staff.

Departures

2017 recruiting class

Source

Schedule and results

|-
!colspan=9 style=| Non-conference regular season

|-
!colspan=9 style=| MAC regular season

|-
!colspan=9 style=| MAC tournament

Source

References

Northern Illinois
Northern Illinois Huskies men's basketball seasons
Northern
Northern